Al-Miswar ibn Makhrama was a companion (Sahabah) of the Islamic prophet, Muhammad, and a Hadith narrator.

References

Sahabah hadith narrators
Date of birth unknown
Date of death unknown